Sólrún Michelsen (born Midjord in Tórshavn on 11 March 1948), grew up in Argir and is a Faroese writer and poet. She received the Barnamentanarheiðursløn Tórshavnar býráðs (Tórshavn Council's Children's Book Prize) in 2002 and the Faroese Literature Prize in 2008. In 2004 she was nominated for the West Nordic Council's Children and Youth Literature Prize for the poem collection Loppugras. In 2015 she was nominated for the Nordic Literature Prize for the novel Hinumegin er mars.

She is married to the Faroese politician and business man Poul Michelsen, the leader of Framsókn (Progress).

Bibliography 
In 1994 she published her debut book which she named Argjafrensar. People who come from Argir (now a part of Tórshavn) are often jokingly referred to as Argjafrensar, which means "male cats from Argir". Her parents moved to Argir from elsewhere, her father  from the small village of Hov on Suðuroy and her mother from Norðskáli on Eysturoy.

Since 2008 Sólrún has worked full-time as a writer. She has written and published in various genres, with her work appearing both in book form and in literary magazines like Birting and Vencil. Sólrún has written poems, short stories, novels and fantasy stories, and has written for children, youth and adults. Since 2006 she has mostly written for adults.

Literature for children and youth 
1994 Argjafrensar - children's book, 146 pages
1996 Útiløgukattar (youth novel), 123 pages
2003 Loppugras (poems for children)
2006 "Óvitar" - ghost story, published in a youth book about ghosts: Spøkilsið sum flenti (The laughing ghost)
2013 Torkils Døtur (children's book)

Fantasy 
1999 Hin útvaldi (fantasy)
2002 Geislasteinar (fantasy)

Short Stories 
1995 "Øðrvísi stuttsøga" - published in Birting
2000 "Maya" (novella) - published in  Birting
2002 "Angi av deyða" - published in  Birting
2004 "Maðurin úr Grauballe" - published in Birting
2006 "Summi renna í stuttum brókum" - published in Vencil 1
2007 "Gjøgnum skygnið" - published in Vencil 3
2009 "Hin blái eingilin" - published in Vencil 6
2011 Rottan (short story collection)
2018 Morgunfrúa (short story collection)
2021 "Olivin"- published in Varðin 2021
2022 "Sunnumorgun" published in Varðin 2022

Novels 
2007 Tema við slankum
2013 Hinumegin er mars
2019 Ein táttur er silvur
2020 Ein annar er gull
2021 Fáur fær tráðin heilt slættan
2021 Nornan spinnur (triologi)

Poems 
1998 "Mítt gamla land" - published in Birting
2000 "Oyggjarnar" (Cantate)
2003 "Við vindeygað" - Birting
2009 "Kantatusálmur" -published in Vencil 7
2009 Í opnu hurðini (poetry collection)  
2016 Ein farri av fráferð (poetry collection)

Published in Mín jólabók and Vencil
1992 "Jól hjá Onnu og Jákupi" – Published in Mín jólabók (My Christmas Book)
1997 "Emma" – Published in Mín jólabók
1998 "Tann fyrsta flykran" and Eg kenni eina vættur - published in Mín jólabók
1999 "Barnajól" and "Magga" - published in Mín jólabók
2000 "Gásasteggin" and "Postboð" - published in Mín jólabók
2001 "Fuglakongurin" and "Hinumegin vindeyga" - published in Mín jólabók
2003 "Tann fyrsta flykran fall í dag" and "Ein dag eg lá á bønum" - published in Mín jólabók
2005 "Sápubløðran" - published in Mín jólabók
2006 "Summi renna í stuttum brókum" - published in Vencil 1
2007 "Jólagávan" - published in Mín jólabók

In Danish translation 
2009 At danse med virkeligheden (translation by Kirsten brix of Tema við slankum)
2017 På den anden side er marts (translation by Kirsten Brix of Hinumegin er mars)

In Norwegian Translation
2017 Sprinkeljenta (translation by Anne-Kari Skarðhamarof of At danse med virkeligheden)
2017 På den andre sida er mars (translation by Lars Moa of Hinumegin er mars)

In English Translation 
2011 "Some people run in shorts" (translation by Marita Thomsen of the short story "Summi renna í stuttum brókum"), published in Vencil Anthology of Contemporary Faroese Literature.
2017 "Some people run in shorts" translation by Marita Thomsen in Anthology for contemporary Nordic Literature:THE DARK BLUE WINTER OVERCOAT
2017 "Some people run in shorts" translation by Marita Thomsen in Boundless Literary Magazine on-line
2014 "The Rat" (Translation of the short story "Rottan") published in  Pankmagazine.com
2018 "The Summer with Halla" (translation by Kerri Pierce of the short story "Summarið við Hallu")published in World Literature Today
2018 "Starlings" (translation by Kerri Pierce of the short story "Starar," published in EUROPENOWJOURNAL.org

In German Translation 
2013 "Der blaue Engel" (German translation of the short story "Hin blái eingilin" published in the collection Mord unterm Nordlicht s. 85-88)
 2014 "Manche laufen in kurzen Hosen" (German translation of the short story "Summi renna í stuttum brókum," published in the collection Narrenflieger)
 2015 "Tanz auf den Klippen" (German translation of "Tema við slankum," translated by Inga Meincke)
 2018 "Die Liebe" (German translation of the short story "Kærleikin," translated by Karen Hertlein.) Published in Neue Nordische Novellen VI

Honours 
2002 Barnamentanarheiðursløn Tórshavnar býráðs
2004 Nominated West Nordic Council's Children and Youth Literature Prize for Loppugras
2008 Faroese Literature Prize (Mentanarvirðisløn M. A. Jacobsens)
2015 Nominated the Nordic Council's Literature Prize

References 

1948 births
Living people
Faroese women writers
Faroese writers
Faroese women novelists
Faroese children's writers
Faroese fantasy writers
20th-century Faroese poets
Faroese short story writers
People from Tórshavn
Faroese Literature Prize recipients
Faroese Children's Literature Prize recipients
Women science fiction and fantasy writers
Faroese women poets
21st-century Faroese poets
20th-century Danish short story writers
21st-century Danish short story writers
20th-century Danish women writers
21st-century Danish women writers